Lee Falls is a waterfall on the Tualatin River in Washington County in the U.S. state of Oregon. Named after 19th century sawmill owner James A. Lee, it is located alongside Southwest Lee Falls Road on private timber land. The falls pour over a basalt rock formation. Unusually for the region, the falls are wider than they are tall. A swimming hole is present beneath the falls. Downstream are Little Lee Falls and the unincorporated community of Cherry Grove. Upstream is Ki-a-Kuts Falls.

Gallery

See also 
 List of waterfalls in Oregon

References 

Waterfalls of Oregon
Tualatin River
Landforms of Washington County, Oregon